Sikkim Janata Congress (translation: Sikkim Popular Congress) was a political party in Sikkim, active in the struggle for democratic reforms. SJC was founded when the Sikkim State Congress and Sikkim Janata Party merged, in October 1972. K.C.Pradhan was it’s President. 

In 1973, SJC merged with Dorjee's Sikkim National Congress.

Electoral history

References

Defunct political parties in Sikkim
1972 establishments in Sikkim
Political parties established in 1972
Political parties disestablished in 1973